Corio is a comune (municipality) in the Metropolitan City of Turin in the Italian region of Piedmont, located about  northwest of Turin.

Corio borders the following municipalities: Locana, Sparone, Pratiglione, Forno Canavese, Coassolo Torinese, Rocca Canavese, Balangero, Mathi, Nole, and Grosso.

External links

References

Canavese
Cities and towns in Piedmont